Viktor Vadász (born 15 August 1986) is a Hungarian football player who currently plays for Mosonmagyaróvári TE.

Honours
Diósgyőr
Hungarian League Cup (1): 2013–14

External links
Profile at HLSZ

1986 births
Living people
Sportspeople from Székesfehérvár
Hungarian footballers
Association football defenders
MTK Budapest FC players
Fehérvár FC players
FC Felcsút players
Kazincbarcikai SC footballers
Diósgyőri VTK players
Újpest FC players
Békéscsaba 1912 Előre footballers
Győri ETO FC players
Mosonmagyaróvári TE 1904 footballers
Nemzeti Bajnokság I players
Nemzeti Bajnokság II players